Jackie Graves (September 12, 1922 – November 15, 2005), alias "The Austin Atom", was a featherweight boxer from Minnesota.

Personal life
Graves was a native of Austin, Minnesota.

Boxing career
From 1944 to 1956 Graves compiled a career record of 82 wins (48 KOs) and 11 losses with 2 draws.  He won the Minnesota State Featherweight Title in only his seventh professional fight, and before his career was over he had fought boxers including Willie Pep, Glen Flanagan, Miguel Acevedo, Del Flanagan, Corky Gonzales and Redtop Davis.

Against Willie Pep
Graves is named as the foil against whom Willie Pep won a round without throwing a punch. This occurrence is sometimes said to have taken place in the third round of a fight between the two. Contemporary reports, however, clearly indicate that Pep threw punches in the third round.

After boxing
Graves was a correspondent for Ring Magazine for many years after his fighting career ended.

Notes

External link

1922 births
2005 deaths
People from Austin, Minnesota
Featherweight boxers
Boxers from Minnesota
American male boxers